Hans Müller (born 24 May 1947) is a Swiss former modern pentathlete. 

Müller competed at the 1972 Summer Olympics in the individual and team events. He placed 45th in the individual, and his team placed 15th.

References

1947 births
Living people
Modern pentathletes at the 1972 Summer Olympics
Olympic modern pentathletes of Switzerland
Swiss male modern pentathletes